The 2006–07 Elite Women's Hockey League season was the third season of the Elite Women's Hockey League, a multi-national women's ice hockey league. HC Slovan Bratislava of Slovakia won the league title for the second time in a row.

Final standings

External links
Season on hockeyarchives.info

Women
European Women's Hockey League seasons
Euro